Thomas Hawthorne Phillips (December 30, 1914 – October 23, 1975) was a justice of the Supreme Court of Texas from October 4, 1972 to December 31, 1972.

Born in Marlin, Texas, Phillips received his law degree from Baylor Law School in 1937, and gained admission to the bar that same year.

References

Justices of the Texas Supreme Court
1914 births
1975 deaths
20th-century American judges
People from Marlin, Texas
Baylor Law School alumni